The 2020 Georgia Tech Yellow Jackets football team represented the Georgia Institute of Technology during the 2020 NCAA Division I FBS football season. The Yellow Jackets were led by second-year head coach Geoff Collins. They played their home games at Bobby Dodd Stadium and competed as a member of the Atlantic Coast Conference (ACC).

After finishing their season with a 3–7 record (3–6 in ACC play), the Yellow Jackets determined that they would not consider a bowl bid (the NCAA waived bowl eligibility requirements for the 2020–21 bowl season).

Previous season
The Yellow Jackets finished the 2019 season with a 3–9 record, 2–6 in ACC play, failing to earn bowl eligibility.

Preseason

Death of Bryce Gowdy
On December 30, 2019, Georgia Tech signee Bryce Gowdy, from Deerfield Beach, Florida, committed suicide by walking in front of a freight train. He died aged 17 and had received a full scholarship to play football at Georgia Tech, having signed on December 18.

ACC media poll

Schedule

Spring game
The Yellow Jackets held spring practices until early March, when the outbreak of the COVID-19 pandemic forced the suspension of all NCAA activities. The Georgia Tech football spring game was scheduled to take place in Atlanta, GA on April 10, 2020, but was also canceled.

Regular schedule
Georgia Tech had games scheduled against Gardner–Webb and Georgia, which were canceled due to the COVID-19 pandemic. This became the first season since 1924 that the Yellow Jackets do not play Georgia.

The ACC released their schedule on July 29, with specific dates selected at a later date.

The above is the original schedule planned for 2020 before changes were made due to the coronavirus pandemic. (needs to be completed)

Game summaries

at Florida State

vs UCF

at Syracuse

vs Louisville

vs Clemson

at Boston College

vs Notre Dame

vs Duke

at NC State

vs Pittsburgh

at Miami (FL)

Coaching staff

Rankings

Players drafted into the NFL

References

Georgia Tech
Georgia Tech Yellow Jackets football seasons
Georgia Tech Yellow Jackets football